This is a list of United States Air Force training squadrons. It covers units that specialize in training such as combat training, flying training, and training squadrons and serves as a break out of the comprehensive List of United States Air Force squadrons. Units in this list are assigned to nearly every Major Command in the United States Air Force.

Combat Training Squadrons

Flying Training Squadrons

Training Squadrons

Student Squadrons

References 

Training